Richard or Dick Reynolds may refer to:
Richard Reynolds (martyr) (c. 1492–1535), English monk
Richard Reynolds (bishop) (1674–1743), English bishop of Lincoln
Richard Reynolds (ironmaster) (1735–1816), manager of and partner in the Coalbrookdale Company and associated ironworks
Richard S. Reynolds Sr. (1881–1955), founder of  Reynolds Metals
Richard S. Reynolds, Jr. (1908–1980), president of Reynolds Metals
Richard Reynolds (footballer) (born 1980), Guyana footballer
R. J. Reynolds (Richard Joshua Reynolds, 1850–1918), American businessman and founder of the R. J. Reynolds Tobacco Company
Richard Reynolds (chemist) (1829–1900), English pharmaceutical chemist and instrument maker
Dick Reynolds (Richard Sylvannus Reynolds, 1915–2002), Australian rules footballer
Dick Reynolds (musician), musician, songwriter and trombonist
Dick Reynolds (politician) (Richard Floyd Reynolds, 1927–2014), American politician